The Stanwich School was a private, coeducational PK-12 college prep school, in Greenwich, Connecticut, established in 1998. The Stanwich School is accredited by the New England Association of Schools and Colleges and is a member of the National Association of Independent Schools.

History
The Stanwich School was conceived by Patricia Young, the founding Head of School, and Dan Reid, the founding Chairman of the Board of Trustees. Young envisioned a school that could instill in its students values based on Judeo-Christian principles and traditions.

In November 2017, The Stanwich School merged with Greenwich Country Day School with plans to build a new high school on the Stanwich Road campus.

References

External links
Official Site

Schools in Greenwich, Connecticut
Educational institutions established in 1998
Private high schools in Connecticut
Private middle schools in Connecticut
Private elementary schools in Connecticut
1998 establishments in Connecticut